You'll Pay for This is the third album by experimental rock band Bear Hands. It is their last album to feature guitarist Ted Feldman before his departure in January 2018.

Track listing 

"I Won't Pay" (2:55)
"2AM" (4:55)
"Boss" (3:06)
"Déjà Vu" (3:17)
"Too Young" (3:45)
"The Shallows" (3:41)
"Like Me Like That" (3:50)
"Chin Ups" (3:25)
"Marathon Man" (4:13)
"Winner's Circle" (3:22)
"I See You" (3:27)
"Purpose Filled Life" (3:05)

Charts

References 

2016 albums
Bear Hands albums